Araichthys loro, is a species of fish in the family Loricariidae found in the rio Papagaio and tributaries, rio Tapajós basin, Mato Grosso State in central Brazil. This species is the only known member of its genus.

References

Ancistrini
Fish described in 2016